also known as simply Muhyo & Roji, is a Japanese manga series written and illustrated by Yoshiyuki Nishi. The series ran in Shueisha's Weekly Shōnen Jump from November 2004 to March 2008. It follows Toru Muhyo and Jiro "Roji" Kusano, a young magical law enforcer and his assistant, as they track down and punish spirits based on the articles written in the book of magical law. The individual chapters of the series were collected and published in 18 tankōbon volumes by Shueisha.

An anime television series adaptation by Studio Deen aired from August to October 2018 on SKY PerfecTV! and Animax. A second season aired from July to September 2020.

The manga is licensed English–language release in North America by Viz Media, which released the eighteen volumes from October 2007 to August 2010 under its "Shonen Jump" manga line. The anime series is licensed by Crunchyroll.

Characters
  
 
Muhyo is said to be the youngest magical law enforcer graduated from the Magical Law School. He paired up with Roji, and the two formed their own business of exorcising spirits. Muhyo has a somewhat emotionless personality, showing no sign of pity when dispensing of the ghosts. He seems to be sleeping most of the time, since large amount of spiritual energy is needed for him to perform exorcism and carry out sentences for spirits. He tries to show no signs of caring for his assistant Roji, but it immediately becomes evident that he does during dangerous situations, or when one of Muhyo's friends or acquaintances points it out. He is often rude to other people, and keeps a stern face, but deep down, he has a strong sense of Justice. He is also extremely powerful, being able to perform a judgment that normally requires four top-notch enforcers by himself. Despite Enchu's vile attacks upon him and those he cares for, he still wished to redeem him. Muhyo has shown that he can speak the language of the underworld allowing him to speak with the creatures that he summons to carry out his sentences. This talent also allows him to command the creatures to pause or stop the punishment that they were delivering.
 

Roji is Muhyo's assistant. He is a kind-hearted person, almost to a fault, as it interferes with his ability to exorcise spirits with a sob story. He is a bit of a whiner and a crybaby. However, he is adept at writing seals to hold back spirits while Muhyo sentences them. He is knowledgeable on types of spirits, but has almost no knowledge on the exorcism of spirits and how to use magical law. He initially feels that Muhyo is rude, mean, and hates him. But as the series progresses, he finds out that Muhyo chose him to be his apprentice even though the normal standard is to choose someone who is the rank of an assistant judge and Muhyo actually deeply cares for him. His power often seemingly fluctuates between strong and weak, becoming stronger when he has more confidence in himself. He was frustrated that Muhyo did not ever instruct him. In a flashback showcasing how Roji met Muhyo, it was revealed that Roji wanted to learn magical law after a friend was possessed and Page showed up and saved him. Roji also successfully used an item only an assistant judge could handle. During the magical law promotion exam, it is revealed that he has an extraordinarily high tempering (ren). Roji is definitely more feminine, which causes comedic scenes to emerge sometimes.
 

Kenji is a troublemaking boy who had believed Muhyo and Roji's business was a sham and wrecked their business sign. He did not believe in spirits until the pair saved him from a blood-drinking ghost he had accidentally freed. Afterwards, Kenji grew a liking for the pair, often referring to Roji as "Bean Sprout" and Muhyo as "Onion". He always tries to find excuses to hang around their office, as Muhyo has made it a rule never to meet a client after the case is complete unless they bring a new one.
  

Nana is a photographer who Kenji introduces to the duo. Her late father had made a living producing fake ghost pictures, causing a rift between the two. Nana becomes another of Muhyo and Roji's regular clients after Muhyo sends her father's troubled spirit to the River Styx for purification so he can go to heaven. She is notably well endowed which often causes her to be the target of perverts. It is later revealed that she is a spirit medium.
  

Yoichi is a magical law judge and Muhyo's childhood friend. He is a pervert who enjoys trying to guess girls' cup sizes, in which he squeezed Nana's breasts during  his first appearance. Although Yoichi appears to have a crush on Nana, she unfortunately considers him as a creep. However, underneath this exterior resides experience and wisdom, almost rivaling that of Muhyo. Yoichi had offered to be Muhyo's partner, but Muhyo had already chosen Roji instead. He is an expert at every type of magical law except for exorcism.
 

Enchu was a childhood friend of Muhyo and Yoichi. Unlike Muhyo, he was studious and serious about magical law. Enchu had wanted to be an enforcer so he could support his family, including his sick mother. Enchu spent hours everyday studying, with his friends not noticing. One day, Muhyo's talent "woke up", which overtook Enchu and created a desire within him to surpass Muhyo. When Muhyo and Enchu were both up for being promoted to enforcer, Enchu had left because he had learned his mother had died. When he had returned, Muhyo had been promoted to enforcer, causing Enchu to break down mentally. He has shown to have some control over various spirits through his knowledge of forbidden magical law. He has also apparently become inhuman as at one point when he generated ten forearms on a single arm. Despite his grudge, Enchu still cares for others, claiming its better to practice forbidden magical law with friends and retreating in order to save Rio who was ghosting. Eventually, Enchu was "saved" from his madness, realizing that his friends never stopped caring about him despite what he put them through. However, this realization did not keep him from punishment, and he was sentenced to the Arcanum afterwards for an indefinite amount of time.
  

Biko is a magical tools master (or artificer), who is able to make magical tools but cannot use them herself. She is deeply devoted to her teacher Rio, and was shocked by the revelation that she was a traitor. Biko disliked Rio when she was younger until Rio saved Biko from an experiment gone wrong. Roji first believed she was a boy when she first appeared. She has three apprentices of her own. She hoped that Rio could be saved, and wished to go raspberry picking with her. After the battle had ended, Biko and Rio lived together since Rio had been sentenced to imprisonment within their home.

Rio is Biko's teacher and a skilled magical tools master (or artificer). While she initially seemed to help Muhyo and Roji, she was actually working with Enchu, having grown bitter after no one helped save her mother from an evil spirit. Despite having become a traitor, she was still fond of Biko, but believed that it was too late to go back. When her mother was alive, Rio had to resort to low means in order to make money so that she could take care of her mother. When a spirit attacked her mother, she frantically sought help but was turned down by the enforcers in her neighborhood. It was revealed that Teeki had intentionally caused the attack on her mother in an attempt to gain Rio as a pawn. When she discovered this, she tried to deny it, then denied that she was able to be saved at all, but soon came to terms with her situation and did her best to turn things around. She lives with Biko, sentenced to imprisonment within their home. According to Muhyo, she is a "kissing fiend", which is an accurate statement.

Sophie was an extremely powerful spirit who was once imprisoned in the Arcanum, but was released by Rio. In life, she was kept away from parties by her older sister due to her being considered "plain", and killed people for their faces because she wanted people to think she was pretty. As a spirit, she was able to shapeshift and assume other people's forms. Muhyo used a high-level magical commandment to sentence her for her crimes. As she faded, she cried and stated, "Sister, why can't I go to the party?". She was a very powerful ghost as it took the usage of an envoy that normally requires four enforcers to defeat her.
 

Imai is a magical law judge. She was assigned to be a guard for the Arcanum, a prison for powerful spirit including Sophie. When Rio freed Sophie, Imai nearly became a victim but was spared because her face looked ugly to Sophie. She was also nearly strangled by Teeki, but luckily escaped. Since the Arcanum incident, she has become friends with Roji and escorted him to the Magical Law School. In chapter 155, it is revealed that Imai possibly has feelings for Roji.

Teeki was Enchu's right-hand man and a powerful but mysterious foe to Muhyo and Roji. The Magical Law Association had marked him for 800 years or so. He "meddled" in magical law, and he disappeared into thin air when he was finished. It was unclear whether Teeki was a spirit or a practitioner turned immortal by forbidden magical law. Teeki was also the one responsible for the fire inside the Arcanum after Rio followed Muhyo and company out into the forest. He seemed to like to kill and destroy, as he laughed at Maeda when he set the Arcanum ablaze and wanted to kill Muhyo's group instead of retreating. He was the one who introduced Enchu to forbidden magical law. Teeki wore a four-eyed mask and gloves that had the mark of forbidden magical law on them.
 

Page is the teacher of Muhyo and Enchu. He is very famous within the association, and he believes that magical law starts with physical fitness. Page likes to compose poetry and thinks he is good at it. He also acts as a father to his students, such as rushing to Muhyo when he was supposed to be healing and showing relief that Muhyo was okay. Although Roji is unaware of it, Page was the practitioner that exorcised a spirit from a friend of his and gave him his tie. He claims that Muhyo and Roji were destined to meet.
  

Goryo is a magical law enforcer like Muhyo, and head of the centuries-old Goryo Group Syndicate. While the Goryo Group Syndicate is not particularly strong in magical law, they make up for it with cunning use of strategy. In addition, they perform extremely vicious practices ranging from bribery to murder. Goryo was a jerk who only cared about money and his family's pride, threatening to release spirits that he had exorcised if clients do not pay him, treating his assistants like trash and discarding them should they fail him. But after the Goryo Group Syndicate is destroyed by Ark and he is rescued from Tomas, he becomes a better person.
  

Ebisu is a magical law judge who worked for Goryo as an assistant. He looks like a clown and is afraid of Goryo's wrath. He clawed his way to where he is now, being jealous of Roji, who was only a clerk and was practically given his current job with Muhyo no less. He helps Goryo in banishing spirits and running his company. After Goryo and Muhyo's competition, he was fired by Goryo for failing him in a strategy. Despite that, he is the first to run to Goryo's aid when the Goryo Group Syndicate is attacked.

Tomas is an evil practitioner working for Ark. He was once a teacher and Page's friend, but it was revealed that he faked his credentials and was wanted for several crimes. He had an obsession for collecting anything from teacups to souls because he paired up with Beelzebub.
 
Panza was a spirit assassin working for the group of forbidden magical law users known as Ark, working directly under Teeki. She was a powerful spirit with an overwhelming obsession with Roji. She used her powers of human puppetry to try and kill off Muhyo and kidnap Roji. It was revealed that she always got bullied because she could see spirits and she wished her knight in shining armor would come and save her. Even her parents forced her out of their house by making her take the magical law promotion exam in order to become Muhyo's assistant and telling her not to come home. She lost her applicant form on the way and no one wanted to help her except for Roji, who gave her one of his applicant forms. That was when Panza fell in love with Roji. Unfortunately, she met Teeki and was misled by him into using forbidden magical law. On her way to heaven, Roji told her that he wished he had known her feelings so they could have been friends, but she said she preferred him as her knight. Her passing was the spark of determination within the group to end Enchu and Teeki's terror.
 
Mick is a swordsman known as Mick the Slasher, who worked for Ark. However, he had a tendency to do what he wanted, and followed orders in his own straightforward style. Unlike many other Ark members, he was very simple-minded and had no long-term goals other than to move on to the next fight. Seemingly relaxed and casual, he could become rather eccentric in battle, using his whole body as a morphing sword. His parents were evil practitioners who were killed by the Magical Law Association after they attacked representatives bearing a treaty.

A master of spirits who worked for Ark. She bore a grudge towards the Magical Law Association for the death of her parents and tried to destroy the Magical Law Association, but was stopped by Goryo and murdered by Buhpu, a fellow member of Ark.

Media

Manga

Written by Yoshiyuki Nishi, Muhyo and Roji's Bureau of Supernatural Investigation was serialized in Shueisha's shōnen manga magazine Weekly Shōnen Jump from November 29, 2004, to March 3, 2008. Shueisha collected its 156 individual chapters in eighteen tankōbon volumes, released from May 2, 2005, to June 4, 2008.

The series has been licensed for English–language release in North America by Viz Media, which released the first volume of the series in October 2007 under its "Shonen Jump" manga line. As of August 2010, the company has published all eighteen volumes of the series.

A sequel series, titled  was serialized in Shōnen Jump+ app from March 19, 2018, to March 7, 2019. Shueisha released two tankōbon volumes on August 3, 2018, and April 4, 2019.

Anime
A 12-episode anime television series produced by Studio Deen aired from August 3 to October 19, 2018, on SKY PerfecTV! and Animax. Nobuhiro Kondo directed the series, while scripts were handled by Yasuyuki Suzuki, music composed by Ryo Kawasaki, characters designed by Kouichiro Kawano, and Kazuko Tadano and Hiromi Matsushita serving as chief animation directors. The opening theme song "Gifted" is performed by SCREEN mode, while the ending theme song "Hotohashiru" is performed by Oresama. The series has been streamed on Crunchyroll.

On June 16, 2019, a second season has been announced, with the staff and cast reprising their roles. It aired from July 7 to September 22, 2020.

At the end of first seven episodes of the first season, a segment called "Let's Learn About Magical Law!" plays on a LawTube channel full of videos, a spoof of a YouTube channel. It documents random facts about magical law, but every video ends in a blooper.

Episode list

Season 1 (2018)

Season 2 (2020)

Reception
For the week of June 5—June 11, the 12th volume of the premiered in seventh place in the list of weekly bestselling manga series in Japan. In Jason Thompson's online appendix to Manga: The Complete Guide, he describes the early volumes as having a "haunt of the week flavor", and describes the manga overall as maintaining a "quirky and sometimes creepy" tone, despite the plot becoming "conventionally melodramatic".

Notes

References

Further reading

External links
 Anime official website
 

2004 manga
Animax original programming
Crunchyroll anime
Dark fantasy anime and manga
Mystery anime and manga
Shōnen manga
Shueisha franchises
Shueisha manga
Studio Deen
Supernatural anime and manga
Viz Media manga